Kyasuchus is an extinct genus of shartegosuchid crocodylomorph. Fossils have been found from the Ilek Formation outcropping in the Kemerovo Oblast of Russia, deposited during the Aptian and Albian stages of the Early Cretaceous. The localities from which specimens of this genus have been found have also yielded many other vertebrate remains such as those of palaeonisciform fishes, turtles, various lizards, troodontids, triconodonts, the ceratopsian Psittacosaurus, and the protosuchian-grade crocodylomorph Tagarosuchus.

References

External links
Kyasuchus in the Paleobiology Database

Early Cretaceous crocodylomorphs of Asia
Fossil taxa described in 2000
Prehistoric pseudosuchian genera